Sgt. Ernesto Baliola: Tinik sa Batas is a 1992 Philippine action film directed by Ricardo "Bebong" Osorio. The film stars Sonny Parsons as the title role. Based on true events, the film is about a sergeant based in Quezon City who begins engaging in Robin Hood-like criminal activities against law enforcement in order to help the slum area dwellers.

Critic Justino Dormiendo of the Manila Standard severely criticized the film for its overall crudeness, stating that it ""doesn't make sense in all aspects, including writing [...], directing [...], and acting."

Cast
Sonny Parsons as Sgt. Ernesto Baliola
Efren Reyes as Atty. Petaga
Aurora Sevilla as Soling
Dindo Arroyo as Chief Goon
Shirley Tesoro as Rowena
Eric Francisco as Eric
Oliver Osorio as Peping
Gilda Aragon as Susan
Fred Moro as Domeng
Joey Padilla as P./Major
Fernando "Chinkee" Tan as Lucio
Melissa Sosa as Letty
Martin Parsons as Jojo
Ricardo Osorio as Col. Cruz
Ros Olgado as Atty. Torrente
Leo Padilla as Erning's Goon
Boy Padilla as Erning's Goon
Gilbert Caprecho as Erning's Goon
Bebeng Amora as Erning's Goon
Art Veloso as Policeman

Release

Critical response
Justino Dormiendo of the Manila Standard gave the film a negative review for its crudeness, writing that it "doesn't make sense in all aspects, including writing [...], directing [...], and acting (if this is what Parsons and company wrongly consider their profession)." Dormiendo added that he was "particularly appalled at the sight of Parsons making a mockery of himself, women, and the character he is portraying.

References

External links

1992 films
1992 action films
Filipino-language films
Films about military personnel
Films set in Metro Manila
Moviestars Production films
Philippine action films